The Saskatchewan Hawks was a professional basketball club based in Saskatoon, Saskatchewan that competed in the International Basketball Association beginning in the 2000–2001 season. The team's ownership group was composed of Tom Tao and former NBA owner Ted Stepien, as well as local private owners. The team's best season was during the 2000–2001 season that saw the Hawks finish second in the division and defeat the Billings RimRockers in the first round of playoffs, before eventually losing to the eventual IBA Champion Dakota Wizards in round two. That season, the team was coached by Rob Spon, before he was unexpectedly let go with two games remaining in the regular season. The director of operations was Travis Grindle. Mike Stefanuk was team manager; Mitchell MacGowan was an Assistant Coach and the other was assistant coach Otis Hailey, who assumed the head coach position after Spon was let go. The team then joined the Continental Basketball Association in 2001 when the IBA folded, along with former IBA rivals, the Dakota Wizards and the Fargo-Moorhead Beez. In their first and only season in the CBA, the Hawks compiled the worst record in the league (8–32), and the team folded during the off-season. Their first coach that year was Laurian Watkins, who was let go in a power struggle.

External links
 Official Site (defunct)

Sport in Saskatoon
Defunct basketball teams in Canada
Defunct sports teams in Saskatchewan
Basketball in Saskatchewan
Basketball teams established in 2000
Basketball teams disestablished in 2001